Hijazi, Hijazy, Hejazi or Hegazy is an Arabic surname originally designating a person (or their ancestor) from the Hejaz region in Saudi Arabia.

People

Hijazi
 Abdallah Hijazi, Lebanese basketball player
 Ahmed Hijazi (poet), Egyptian contemporary poet
 Ali Hijazi, Sierra Leonean basketball player
 Amal Hijazi, Lebanese singer
 Farouk Hijazi, Iraqi diplomat
 Fouad Hijazi, Lebanese footballer
 Naseem Hijazi, Urdu novelist
 Nawal Hijazi, Lebanese voice actress
 Zane Hijazi, American Vine creator and YouTuber, member of David Dobrik's Vlog Squad

Hejazi
 Abdol Hossein Hejazi (1904–1969), Iranian military officer
 Attila Hejazi, Iranian football player and coach
 Mohammad Hejazi, Iranian military commander
 Nasser Hejazi, Iranian football goalkeeper

See also
 Hejazi Arabic
 Hejazi turban

References

Arabic-language surnames
Iranian-language surnames